The Legendary Axe II is a horizontal platform video game created in 1990 by Victor Musical Industries. It is the follow-up to The Legendary Axe.

Gameplay 

Gameplay is similar to the previous game, but the "strength charging" has been removed. Multiple, swappable weapons have been added, obtained by collecting those icons: sword, axe, and morning star. In addition, the player has a stock of screen-clearing bombs that can be used by pressing Run. Defeated enemies drop these weapons and bombs, as well as health refills and extensions, and so on.

Unlike the previous entry and its vibrant and colorful visuals and sound, II is dark and threatening in tone; combined with the changes to the weapon system, The Legendary Axe II is even more like Rastan.

Plot 

The king and queen of a royal kingdom die and their two sons have to fight for the throne. Prince Sirius loses to the evil Prince Zach. The tone is set for the good son, Prince Sirius, to reclaim the throne.

Development and release

Reception 

The Legendary Axe II was met with mostly positive reception from critics. Electronic Gaming Monthly was an exception; the magazine's four reviewers all razed it for its near-complete lack of similarity to the original The Legendary Axe, and further said that even judged on its own terms it is a decent but unexceptional game. In contrast, Computer and Video Games called it "a great sequel, and a brilliant hack 'n slash in its own right." The reviewer applauded the atmospheric backdrops, ambient sounds, and strong difficulty curve. GamePro likewise felt it to be a satisfying sequel, concluding, "Remember, you axed for it!" in allusion to the heavy fan outcry for a Legendary Axe sequel. The reviewer particularly praised the graphics and variety of enemies.

Notes

References

External links 
 The Legendary Axe II at GameFAQs
 The Legendary Axe II at Giant Bomb
 The Legendary Axe II at MobyGames

1990 video games
Atlus games
Fantasy video games
Platform games
Red Entertainment games
Side-scrolling platform games
Side-scrolling video games
Single-player video games
TurboGrafx-16 games
TurboGrafx-16-only games
Video game sequels
Video games developed in Japan
Video games scored by Hirotoshi Suzuki
Victor Entertainment games
Censored video games